is a live video by Japanese singer/songwriter Chisato Moritaka. Recorded live at the Nakano Sun Plaza in Nakano, Tokyo on March 3, 1991, the video was released on September 17, 2014 by Warner Music Japan on Blu-ray and DVD formats; each with a two-disc audio CD version of the concert. It is a digitally remastered version of the live video originally released on June 17, 1991, with two additional songs and previously unreleased footage. A limited edition Blu-ray boxed set includes a Blu-ray copy of the original 1991 cut, a photo booklet, a miniature reprint of the original tour pamphlet, and a sticker sheet.

The video peaked at No. 13 on Oricon's Blu-ray chart and at No. 83 on Oricon's DVD chart.

Track listing 
Blu-ray/DVD

* Previously unreleased track.

CD

Personnel 
 Chisato Moritaka – vocals, tambourine
 The Janet Jacksons
 Yasuaki Maejima – keyboards
 Shin Kōno – keyboards, guitar
 Hiroyoshi Matsuo – guitar
 Masafumi Yokoyama – bass
 Makoto "George" Yoshiwara – drums

Charts

References

External links 
  (Chisato Moritaka)
  (Warner Music Japan)
 

2014 live albums
2014 video albums
Chisato Moritaka video albums
Japanese-language live albums
Japanese-language video albums
Live video albums
Warner Music Japan albums
Albums recorded at Nakano Sun Plaza